Will Hutchins (born Marshall Lowell Hutchason; May 5, 1930) is an American actor most noted for playing the lead role of the young lawyer Tom Brewster, in the Western television series Sugarfoot, which aired on ABC from 1957 to 1961 for 69 episodes.

Early life
Hutchins was born in the Atwater Village neighborhood of Los Angeles. As a child, he visited the location filming of Never Give a Sucker an Even Break and made his first appearance as an extra in a crowd.

He attended Pomona College in Claremont, California, where he majored in Greek drama. He also studied at the University of California at Los Angeles, where he enrolled in cinema classes.

During the Korean War, he served for two years in the United States Army Signal Corps as a cryptographer in Paris, serving as a Corporal with SHAPE. Following his enlistment he enrolled as a graduate student at UCLA in their Cinema Arts department on the G. I. Bill.

Hutchins began acting and got a role on Matinee Theatre.

Career

Warner Bros.
Hutchins was discovered by a talent scout for Warner Bros., who changed his name from Marshall Lowell Hutchason to Will Hutchins. The young actor's easygoing manner was compared to Will Rogers, the Oklahoma humorist.

His contract led him to guest appearances in Warner Bros. Television programs, such as Conflict, in which he appeared in three hour-long episodes, including his screen debut as Ed Masters in "The Magic Brew" on October 16, 1956.

Hutchins was also cast as a guest star on Cheyenne, Bronco, Maverick and 77 Sunset Strip.

He had small roles in the Warners movies Bombers B-52 (1957), Lafayette Escadrille (1958), and No Time for Sergeants (1958) where he screen tested for the lead of Will Stockdale with James Garner playing the psychiatrist.

Sugarfoot
Hutchins leapt to national fame in the lead of Sugarfoot, in which he played a frontier lawyer with intermittent comedic overtones.

During the series' run he guest-starred on other Warner Bros shows such as The Roaring 20's, Bronco, and Surfside 6. He was the lead guest star in an episode of Maverick entitled "Bolt from the Blue" written and directed by Robert Altman and starring Roger Moore as Beau Maverick.

Warners tried him in the lead of a feature, Young and Eager (1961) aka Claudelle Inglish with Diane McBain.

He tried another pilot for a series, Howie, that was not picked up and appeared with Jeff Chandler in the Warners war film Merrill's Marauders (1962), a picture filmed in the Philippine Islands and Chandler's last acting role.

After this Hutchins left Warners.

Post-Warners
Hutchins guest-starred on Gunsmoke and The Alfred Hitchcock Hour.

While appearing in a play in Chicago in late 1963, he was flown to Los Angeles to shoot a television pilot for MGM, Bert I. Gordon's Take Me to Your Leader, in which Hutchins played a Martian salesman who came to Earth. Though the pilot was not picked up, it led MGM to sign him for Spinout, in which he co-starred as Lt. Tracy Richards ("Dick Tracy" transposed) alongside Elvis Presley.

Also in 1963, he appeared on an episode of Gunsmoke. In S8/Ep24, "Blind Man's Bluff", his character was Billy Poe.

In 1965, Hutchins co-starred with Jack Nicholson and Warren Oates in Monte Hellman's The Shooting.

In 1966, he made a guest appearance on the CBS courtroom drama series Perry Mason as murderer Don Hobart in "The Case of the Scarlet Scandal". (He also appeared as Dan Haynes in The New Perry Mason in 1973 in the episode, "The Case of the Deadly Deeds". Actress Jodie Foster was in this same episode.)

Other TV series
In 1966–1967, he co-starred with Sandy Baron in Hey, Landlord, set in a New York City apartment building. The program followed Walt Disney's Wonderful World of Color, but it failed to attract a sustaining audience against CBS's The Ed Sullivan Show and ABC's The F.B.I. with Efrem Zimbalist Jr., his former Warner Brothers colleague.

Hutchins was reunited with Presley in Clambake (1967).

In 1968–1969, Hutchins starred as Dagwood Bumstead in a CBS television version of the comic strip Blondie.

1970s
He travelled to Rhodesia to appear in Shangani Patrol (1970) playing Frederick Russell Burnham.

Back in the United States, Hutchins guest-starred on Love, American Style, Emergency!, Chase, Movin' On, The Streets of San Francisco, and The Quest. He was in The Horror at 37,000 Feet (1973), Slumber Party '57 (1976), and The Happy Hooker Goes to Washington (1977).

He also began appearing in circuses as Patches the Clown.

Later career
Hutchins had roles in Roar (1981), Gunfighter (1999) and The Romantics (2010).

Personal life
Hutchins was married to Chris Burnett, sister of Carol Burnett, with whom he had a daughter.

Major appearances
 1965, The Shooting (film); Monte Hellman's low-budget Western with Jack Nicholson and Warren Oates.
 1966, Spinout (film); Hutchins co-starred as Lt. Tracy Richards with Elvis Presley.
 1967, Clambake (film); Hutchins co-stars with Elvis Presley, Shelley Fabares, and Bill Bixby.
 1970, Shangani Patrol (film); co-starred as real-life American scout Frederick Burnham in a film based on the actual events of the Shangani Patrol, shot on location in Rhodesia.
 1976, The Quest, a short-lived NBC western series, starring Kurt Russell and Tim Matheson.
 1998, Gunfighter (film); a modern Western directed by Christopher Coppola.

Filmography

Bombers B-52 (1957) – Roberts – B-52 Navigator (uncredited)
Lafayette Escadrille (1958) – Dave Putnam
No Time for Sergeants (1958) – Lt. George Bridges
Cheyenne (1961 episode "Duel at Judas Basin) – Tom 'Sugarfoot' Brewster
Claudelle Inglish (1961) – Dennis Peasley
Merrill's Marauders (1962) – Chowhound
The Shooting (1966) – Coley
Spinout (1966) – Lt. Tracy Richards
Clambake (1967) – Tom Wilson / 'Scott Heyward'
Shangani Patrol (1970) – Frederick Russell Burnham
The Horror at 37,000 Feet (1973, TV Movie) – Steve Holcomb
Magnum Force (1973) – Stakeout Cop (uncredited)
Slumber Party '57 (1976) – Harold Perkins
The Happy Hooker Goes to Washington (1977) – Randall Petersdorf
Roar (1981) – Committee Member
Maverick (1994; scenes cut) – Spectator (uncredited)
Gunfighter (1999) – The Judge
The Romantics (2010) – Grandpa McDevon

References

External links

Western Clippings Website
 Interview with Will Hutchins at Classic Film & TV Cafe, 25 July 2022

1930 births
Living people
American male television actors
American male film actors
Pomona College alumni
UCLA Film School alumni
Male actors from Los Angeles
People from Long Island
Warner Bros. contract players
United States Army soldiers
United States Army personnel of the Korean War
Western (genre) television actors